The Archaeological Survey of Canada is a division of the Canadian Museum of Civilization. Its mandate is the preservation of archaeological sites and research and publication on the history of the native peoples of Canada.

External links
 Canadian Museum of Civilization http://www.civilization.ca/visit/indexe.aspx

Archaeology of Canada